Chris Knapp may refer to:

 Chris Knapp (baseball) (born 1953), retired American baseball player
 Chris Knapp (musician), drummer with The Ataris
 Chris Knapp (politician), American politician